This was the 1995-96 Alpenliga season, the fifth season of the multi-national ice hockey league. 17 teams participated in three groups – Western, Central, and Eastern. VEU Feldkirch of Austria won the championship by defeating CE Wien in the final.

Regular season

West Group

Central Group

East Group

Playoffs

Play-in 
 HC Varèse (W2) – CE Wien (O2): 3:6
 HK Jesenice (O1) – HDD Olimpija Ljubljana (M2): 2:4

Semifinals 
 VEU Feldkirch (W1) – HDD Olimpija Ljubljana (M2): 5:3
 EC KAC (M1) – CE Wien (O2): 1:2

3rd place 
 EC KAC (M1) – HDD Olimpija Ljubljana (M2): 0:2

Final 
 VEU Feldkirch (W1) – CE Wien (O2): 4:0

External links
 1995-96 season

Alpenliga seasons
2
Alpenliga
Alpenliga
Alpenliga